The M1917 was the United States' first mass-produced tank, entering production shortly before the end of World War I.  It was a license-built near-copy of the French Renault FT, and was intended to arm the American Expeditionary Forces in France, but American manufacturers failed to produce any in time to take part in the War. Of the 4,440 ordered, about 950 were eventually completed. They remained in service throughout the 1920s but did not take part in any combat, and were phased out during the 1930s.

History 
The United States entered World War I on the side of the Entente Powers in April, 1917, without any tanks of its own. The following month, in the light of a report into British and French tank theories and operations, the American Expeditionary Forces' commander-in-chief, Gen. John Pershing, decided that both light and heavy tanks were essential for the conduct of the war and should be acquired as soon as possible. A joint Anglo-American programme was set up to develop a new type of heavy tank similar to those then in use by the British. It was, though, expected that sizeable quantities would not be available until April of the following year. Because of the wartime demands on French industry, the Inter-Allied Tank Commission decided that the quickest way to supply the American forces with sufficient armor was to manufacture the Renault FT light tank in the US.

A requirement of 1,200 was decided, later increased to 4,400, and some sample Renault tanks, plans, and various parts were sent to the US for study.  The design was to be carried out by the Ordnance Department, under the job title "Six-ton Special Tractor," and orders for the vehicles placed with private manufacturers. However, the project was beset by problems: the French specifications were metric and incompatible with American (imperial) machinery; coordination between military departments, suppliers, and manufacturers was poor; bureaucratic inertia, lack of cooperation from military departments, and possible vested interests delayed progress.

The Army in France was expecting the first 100 M1917s by April 1918, and 600 per month thereafter. In the event, production did not begin until the autumn, and the first completed vehicles emerged only in October. Two tanks arrived in France on November 20, nine days after the end of hostilities, and a further eight in December. In the summer of 1918, with no sign of the M1917s and US troops desperately needed at the Front, France supplied 144 Renault FTs, which were used to equip the US Light Tank Brigade.

After the war, the Van Dorn Iron Works, the Maxwell Motor Co., and the C.L. Best Co. built 950 M1917s. 374 had cannons, 526 had machine guns, and 50 were signal (wireless) tanks. These were delivered to the Tank Corps, to complement about 200 Renault FTs brought back from France.

Visible differences from the Renault FT 
The M1917 can be distinguished from the Renault FT by means of several external features.

The exhaust is on the left hand side instead of on the right.
The FT mantlet for the machine-gun or 37mm cannon is replaced with a new design.
Solid steel idler wheels replaced the steel-rimmed wooden or seven-spoked steel ones on the FT
Additional vision slits are added to aid the driver.
All M1917s have a polygonal turret; none used the circular turret type fitted to approximately 50% of Renault FTs.
The frontal armor below the turret was also slightly modified.

Operational use 

The M1917 did not take part in any combat, but was used domestically in various riots to quell mobs such as the Washington race riot of 1919 and the 1920 Lexington riot.

In June 1920 the Tank Corps was abolished as a separate branch, and control of tanks handed to the infantry. The number of tank units was progressively reduced, and the vehicles mothballed or scrapped.

Five accompanied the U.S. Marine Expeditionary Force (the China Marines) to Tientsin in April 1927 under General Smedley Butler, but there is no record of shots being fired. They returned to the US in late 1928.

In July 1932 six M1917s were deployed in Washington D.C. during the dispersal of the Bonus Army. George S. Patton Jr. states in his diaries that these vehicles were carried in trucks as a deterrent, but contemporary film shows them moving on their tracks along Pennsylvania Avenue. It is not believed that any shots were fired.

In 1940 the Canadian Army bought 250 surplus examples at scrap value (about $240 each) and the Royal Canadian Armoured Corps gained valuable experience and training on them before embarking to Europe and using more modern equipment. The Canadian Army took delivery of 236 surplus M1917s. Fifteen of them apparently went to Camp Borden for training use, while others went to train individual units such as the Fort Garry Horse and possibly another three.

Variant 
M1917 A1: In 1929 an M1917 was fitted with a Franklin six-cylinder, air-cooled engine. This involved lengthening the engine compartment by approx. . In 1930-31 seven M1917s were fitted with the  version of the Franklin.

Surviving examples 
Approximately 20 M1917s survive.

Depiction in films 
M1917s were used by U.S. film-makers on numerous occasions as a substitute for Renault FTs, to depict either American tank actions during World War I or Renaults in use by European armies during and after the War.

See also
 List of U.S. military vehicles by supply catalog designation SNL G-12
 SCR-189
 Tanks of the United States

References

Further reading 
 
 The Encyclopaedia of Tanks and Armoured Fighting Vehicles; Published in 2007 by Amber Books Ltd.
 Zaloga, Steven J. Armored Thunderbolt, The US Army Sherman in World War II. 2008, Stackpole Books.  .
 Treat 'Em Rough; Dale E. Wilson, pub. Presidio, 1989.
 U.S. Military Tracked Vehicles; Fred W. Crismon, pub. Crestline, 1992.
 The Fighting Tanks Since 1916; Jones, Rarey, & Icks, pub. We Inc., 1933.
 Armoured Fighting vehicles of the World: Vol 1; Various, pub. Cannon Books, 1998.
 The Patton Papers, 1885-1940; Martin Blumenson, .
 America's Munitions 1917-1918, Report of Benedict Crowell, the Assistant Secretary of War, Chapter 8 "Tanks", Washington Government Printing Office, 1919.

External links 
 American six-ton tank M1917 – Walk around photos
 American six-ton tank M1917(Fort Knox) – Walk around photos
 Craig Moore's "Tanks Encyclopedia" Page on the M1917 6-Ton Tank
 M1917 Six Ton Tank at Old Rhinebeck Aerodrome
Light tanks of the United States
World War I tanks of the United States